Modesta Uka (born 23 May 1999) is a Kosovan footballer who plays as a forward for Austrian ÖFB-Frauenliga club Sturm Graz and the Kosovo women's national team.

Career
Uka has been capped for the Kosovo national team, appearing for the team during the UEFA Women's Euro 2021 qualifying cycle.

See also
List of Kosovo women's international footballers

References

External links
 
 
 
 
 

1999 births
Living people
Kosovan women's footballers
Women's association football forwards
Kosovo women's international footballers
ÖFB-Frauenliga players
SK Sturm Graz (women) players
Expatriate women's footballers in Austria
Kosovan expatriate sportspeople in Austria